Henrik Hansen, better known by his in-game name Froggen, is a Danish professional League of Legends player. He is currently signed with Luminosity Gaming as a streamer. Over the course of his career he has also played for CLG.EU, Evil Geniuses, Alliance, Elements, Origen, Echo Fox, the Golden Guardians and Dignitas. Anivia is considered his signature champion.

Early life 
Hansen was born in Denmark. Since his childhood, he has played games such as Counter-Strike and Warcraft 3, and was introduced to League of Legends by his brother.

Career

2012 
In 2012, Froggen helped CLG.EU finish third at the Season 2 World Championship.

2013 
In January, Froggen signed with Evil Geniuses and moved to their gaming house in Berlin. The team qualified for the inaugural spring split of the EU LCS and finished 4th with a 15–13 record in the regular season, qualifying them for the playoffs; in which they finished 3rd.

In December 2013, Froggen joined Alliance, who took Evil Geniuses' spot in the EU LCS after they moved to the NA LCS.

2014 
In the 2014 EU LCS Spring Split, Froggen's team Alliance finished 3rd in the regular season with 16–12, qualifying for playoffs and finishing in 4th.

In the 2014 EU LCS Summer Split, Alliance went 21–7 in the regular season and finished in first place, making it to playoffs and staying in first place after defeating Fnatic in the finals and earning themselves an invitation to the 2014 League of Legends World Championship.

At worlds Alliance unexpectedly went 3–3 in their group bracket and failed to make playoffs, ending up in 9–12th place.

2015 
After a change to LCS branding rules, Alliance's League of Legends team was required to rebrand itself and leave the organization. The team subsequently rebranded into Elements.

Elements finished 7th in the 2015 EU LCS Spring Split and Summer Split, failing to qualify for playoffs both times.

In November, Elements released all of their players except for Froggen and Nyph.

Froggen was voted by fans to appear in the 2015 All Stars tournament in Los Angeles in December. At the event he had a 1v1 exhibition match against reigning world champion SK Telecom T1's Lee "Faker" Sang-hyeok which he won.

2016 
On 2 January he moved to Southern California to join Echo Fox, which had just bought a spot in the North American League of Legends Championship Series.

Echo Fox finished last in the 2016 Summer NA LCS with a 1–17 record, which meant the team could be relegated to the League of Legends Challenger Series. After defeating NRG eSports 3-0 they re-qualified for the 2017 NA LCS Spring Split.

2017 
After speculations about Froggen leaving Echo Fox rise, he subsequently released his official statement on YouTube in regards to his termination with the team and shared his perspective outlook for the future in 2018.

2018 
It was widely rumored on Twitch and Discord that Froggen would be returning to the League of Legends professional scene in 2018. This was later confirmed by Origen on Twitter on 5 April 2018, as they announce that Froggen will be joining them as their mid laner. Froggen left Origen after their victory in the 2018 European Cup and was subsequently signed by the Golden Guardians on 8 December 2018 as their mid laner.

2019 
Froggen then went on to play for Golden Guardians in the NA LCS season 9 finishing 5/6th in the spring split. He would retain his starting spot for summer.

2020 
Froggen signed with  Dignitas for the 2020 LCS season. In the Spring Split they finished with a record of 8-10, placing just outside of playoffs at seventh. For the summer split, Froggen was benched after six games and moved down to the academy roster. He would then play the rest of the season on Dignitas Academy.

Tournament results

CLG.EU 
 4th — Season 2 World Championship

Evil Geniuses 
 3rd — 2013 Spring NA LCS playoffs

Alliance 
 4th — 2014 Spring EU LCS playoffs
 1st — 2014 Summer EU LCS playoffs

Elements 
 7th — 2015 Spring EU LCS

Echo Fox 
 7th — 2016 Spring NA LCS
 10th — 2016 Summer NA LCS
 8th — 2017 Spring NA LCS

Origen 
 1st — 2018 EU Masters

Golden Guardians 
5th–6th — 2019 Spring LCS
7th – 2019 Summer LCS

References

External links 
 

League of Legends mid lane players
Alliance (esports) players
Counter Logic Gaming players
Dignitas (esports) players
Echo Fox players
Elements (esports) players
Evil Geniuses players
Golden Guardians players
MTw players
Team Razer players
Danish esports players
Danish expatriates in Germany
Danish expatriates in the United States
Living people
1994 births